Patricia Flint Borns (17 February 1922 – 15 April 2009) was a pediatric radiologist.

Education 
Borns received her Bachelor in Science from Purdue and her medical degree from Woman's Medical College of Pennsylvania where she was elected to Alpha Omega Alpha.

Borns completed her medical internship at Philadelphia General Hospital and subsequently completed a radiology residency at the University of Pennsylvania where she trained under Dr. Henry Pendergrass and was the first female graduate of the program.

Career 
First working at Thomas Jefferson University hospital, she went on to work and head the department of radiology at the Children's Hospital of Pennsylvania, Hahnemann University Hospital, and A.I. duPont Institute for Children. She retired from medicine in 1990. For her service, an endowed chair was created at the Children's Hospital of Philadelphia.

Research 
During Borns' research career she published on a wide range of pediatric radiology topics.

Selected publications 
 ;
 ;
 ;
 ;

Memberships 
 American College of Radiology Fellow

Awards 
1995: Richard D. Wood Alumni Award - “To Patricia Flint Borns, M.D., outstanding alumna, a most distinguished Pediatric Radiologist, teacher, valued friend and colleague. April 7, 1995.”
1996: Outstanding Educator Award of the Philadelphia Roentgen Ray Society

References 

1922 births
2009 deaths
Purdue University alumni
Woman's Medical College of Pennsylvania alumni
American radiologists
Women radiologists